Sataniv is an urban-type settlement in Khmelnytskyi Raion, Khmelnytskyi Oblast, Ukraine. It hosts the administration of Sataniv settlement hromada, one of the hromadas of Ukraine. Population: 

Until 18 July 2020, Sataniv belonged to Horodok Raion. The raion was abolished in July 2020 as part of the administrative reform of Ukraine, which reduced the number of raions of Khmelnytskyi Oblast to three. The area of Horodok Raion was merged into Khmelnytskyi Raion.

Jewish History
A Jewish community was organized in Sataniv in the second half of the 16th century, in the kingdom of Poland. Jews in Sataniv were involved in the import of goods from the east, leasing of estates and customs dues, manufacture of alcoholic drinks, and goldsmithery.

The town was periodically attacked by the Tatars and Cossacks, including combined attacks in 1651 and from the Cossacks in 1703. The synagogue in Sataniv was built as a fortress to allow the Jews and the wider community to defend themselves in such attacks.

In the 18th century Sataniv was Podolia's leading community. In 1756 its dayyanim (religious judges) held a trial of the Frankists. In 1765 there were 1,369 Jews paying the poll tax in Sataniv. The Jews there were involved in international commerce, traveling to fairs in Leipzig, Breslau, and Frankfurt, until the Second Partition of Poland of 1793, when Sataniv was incorporated into Russia.

The Hebrew writer and maskil Isaac Satanow lived in Sataniv, and was active there in the latter half of the 18th century. He, Menachem Mendel Lefin, and Alexander b. Ẓevi Margaliot, all of whom also lived in the town, were among the pioneers of the Haskalah movement. From the end of the 18th century and during the 19th, Sataniv was an important center of Hasidism.

Until 1862 the Jewish settlement there was restricted by the authorities, because of Sataniv's closeness to the Austrian border. The Jewish population was 2,848, 64% of the total, in 1897. In 1919, Jews in Sataniv underwent pogroms by Ukrainian nationalists. In 1926 Satanov probably had 2,359 Jews, then declining to 1,516, or 40% of the total population. A rural Jewish council existed in the Soviet period. On 6 July 1941 the Germans entered Sataniv, and on 14 [15(?)] May 1942 Ukrainian police locked 286 Jews into two cellars, letting them suffocate. (The remains of the 286 victims were found on 27 July 2020). Throughout 1942, 210 Jews were shot. The Germans murdered 800 people according to official numbers, most of them Jews.

See also
Three hares

External links
Sataniv in the JewishGen ShtetLinks project
The murder of the Jews of Sataniv during World War II, at Yad Vashem website.

References

Urban-type settlements in Khmelnytskyi Raion
Zbruch
Proskurovsky Uyezd
Jewish Ukrainian history
Holocaust locations in Ukraine